The 17th Virginia Infantry Regiment was an infantry regiment raised in Virginia for service in the Confederate States Army during the American Civil War. It fought mostly with the Army of Northern Virginia.

17th Infantry Regiment was organized at Manassas Junction, Virginia, in June, 1861, using the 6th Battalion Virginia Militia as its nucleus. Men of this unit were recruited in the city of Alexandria, counties of Arlington(Then called Alexandria County), Fairfax, Fauquier, Loudoun, Prince William, and Warren.

After fighting at First Manassas in a brigade under James Longstreet, it was assigned to General Ewell's, A.P. Hill's, Kemper's, and Corse's Brigade. The 17th fought with the Army of Northern Virginia from Williamsburg to Fredericksburg, then participated in Longstreet's Suffolk Expedition. During the Gettysburg Campaign it was on detached duty at Gordonsville and later served in Tennessee and North Carolina. Returning to Virginia it fought at Drewry's Bluff and Cold Harbor, saw action in the Petersburg trenches, and ended the war at Appomattox.

This regiment totaled 600 men in April, 1862, lost 17 killed and 47 wounded at Williamsburg, had 18 killed and 41 wounded at Seven Pines, and had 17 killed, 23 wounded, and 73 missing at Frayser's Farm. It reported 48 casualties at Second Manassas, 13 at South Mountain, and of the 55 engaged at Sharpsburg about seventy-five percent were disabled. At Drewry's Bluff 7 were killed and 23 wounded. Many were captured at Sayler's Creek, and 2 officers and 46 men surrendered on April 9, 1865.

The field officers were Colonels Montgomery D. Corse, Arthur Herbert, and Morton Marye; Lieutenant Colonels William Munford and Grayson Tyler; and Majors George W. Brent and Robert H. Simpson.

See also

List of Virginia Civil War units

References

 Glasgow, Jr., William Mitchell, Northern Virginia's Own: The 17th Virginia Infantry Regiment, Confederate States Army, © 1989, Gobell Press, Alex., VA.
 Johnson, II, William Page, Brothers and Cousins: Confederate Soldiers and Sailors of Fairfax County, Virginia, © 1995, Iberian Press, Athens, GA.
 The Fairfax Rifles, Co. D, 17th Virginia Infantry, C.S.A.

External links
 

Units and formations of the Confederate States Army from Virginia
1861 establishments in Virginia
Military units and formations established in 1861
1865 disestablishments in Virginia
Military units and formations disestablished in 1865